Alejandra Pérez may refer to:
 Alejandra Pérez Espina, Chilean political activist
 Alejandra Pérez Lecaros, Chilean politician and lawyer